Chakra was the third studio album of the South Korean girl group Chakra. The singles were Come Back and The. They won the Best Dance Award for their single The. The album sold about 200,000 copies, making it their best selling album to date.

Track listing 

 Dorawa (돌아와)
 Da (다)
 I'll Be Alright (Gihoe) (기회)
 If
 Minyeo Sachongsa (미녀 사총사)
 Jipchak (집착)
 Garasadae (가라사대)
 Geudaereul Saranghamnida (그대를 사랑합니다)
 Mong (몽)
 Love Fool
 Yeokjeon (Hury Up Now) (역전)
 Wind

2002 albums
Chakra (group) albums